Nicolás Almagro was the defending champion, but lost in the quarterfinals to Frederico Gil.

In the final, Tommy Robredo defeated Thomaz Bellucci, 6–3, 3–6, 6–4.

Seeds

Draw

Finals

Top half

Bottom half

Qualifying

Seeds

Qualifiers

Draw

First qualifier

Second qualifier

Third qualifier

Fourth qualifier

External links
Draw
Qualifying Draw

Singles